The following is a list of notable past or present players of the Green Bay Packers professional American football team.

All-time roster
Green Bay Packers players: A-D
Green Bay Packers players: E-K
Green Bay Packers players: L-R
Green Bay Packers players: S-Z

Current players

Pro Football Hall of Famers

 26 Herb Adderley
 36 LeRoy Butler
 3 Tony Canadeo
 87 Willie Davis
 44 Bobby Dillon
 4 Brett Favre
 83 Len Ford
 75 Forrest Gregg
 83 Ted Hendricks
 38 Arnie Herber
 30 Clarke Hinkle
 5 Paul Hornung
 36 Cal Hubbard
 14 Don Hutson
 74 Henry Jordan
 2 Walt Kiesling
 64 Jerry Kramer
 1 Earl (Curly) Lambeau
 80 James Lofton
 24 Johnny "Blood" McNally
 2 Mike Michalske
 66 Ray Nitschke
 51 Jim Ringo
 89 Dave Robinson
 15 Bart Starr
 10 Jan Stenerud
 31 Jim Taylor
 45 Emlen Tunnell
 92 Reggie White
 24 Willie Wood
 21 Charles Woodson

Retired numbers

#3 Tony Canadeo
#4 Brett Favre 
#14 Don Hutson
#15 Bart Starr
#66 Ray Nitschke
#92 Reggie White

Packers Hall of Fame

First-round draft picks

See also
:Category:Green Bay Packers players

External links
 packers.com player info

 
G
players